Igrexa de Santa María das Areas is a church in Finisterra, Province of A Coruña, Galicia, Spain. It was founded in the 12th century.

References

12th-century Roman Catholic church buildings in Spain
Churches in Galicia (Spain)
Buildings and structures in the Province of A Coruña